VuTV was an IPTV Pay TV service available via "Channel 238", with Subscription TV channels available to subscribers with a broadband connected Freeview box. It was first demonstrated at the International Broadcasting Convention in September 2013 and was launched on 28 November 2013. The service closed after almost two years on 22 October 2015.

Available Channels
The following channels were available (in the same order as listed within the VuTV service)

Lifetime
Comedy Central
MTV
CNN International
History
H2
Crime & Investigation Network
Cartoon Network
Boomerang
Nickelodeon
Nicktoons
Nick Jr.
Cartoonito

Technical
VuTV utilised the MHEG-5 international standard for interactive television services as specified in the D-Book published by the Digital TV Group. Specifically, it relied on the MHEG Interaction Channel (MHEG-IC) for the delivery of applications, data and video content via IP. The video streams were encoded using H.264/MPEG-4 AVC, audio was encoded using Advanced Audio Coding and these were delivered encapsulated in an MPEG transport stream. Given the premium nature of the content, all channels were encrypted.

References

External links

Sports Broadcasting

Streaming television